Biyi is a Nigerian male given name. Notable people with the name include:

 Biyi Afonja (born 1935), Nigerian professor
 Biyi Alo (born 1994), English rugby union footballer
 Biyi Bandele (1967–2022), Nigerian novelist, playwright, and filmmaker

African masculine given names